Natalia Dorado Gómez (born February 25, 1967 in Madrid) is a former field hockey player from Spain. She was a member of the Women's National Team that surprisingly won the golden medal at the 1992 Summer Olympics on home soil (Barcelona). She also competed in the 1996 Summer Olympics in Atlanta, Georgia, where Spain finished in 8th and last position.

References
sports-reference

External links
 

1967 births
Spanish female field hockey players
Olympic field hockey players of Spain
Field hockey players at the 1992 Summer Olympics
Field hockey players at the 1996 Summer Olympics
Living people
Olympic gold medalists for Spain
Field hockey players from Madrid
Olympic medalists in field hockey
Medalists at the 1992 Summer Olympics
20th-century Spanish women